The Devil Diamond is a 1937 American film directed by Leslie Goodwins.

The film is also known as Peter B. Kyne's The Devil Diamond (American complete title).

Plot summary
A group of thugs tries to steal the cursed title gem from a jeweler who has been hired to cut it into small, saleable pieces.

Cast
Frankie Darro as Lee
Kane Richmond as Jerry Carter
June Gale as Dorothy Lanning
Rosita Butler as Yvonne Wallace
Robert Fiske as 'Professor' John Henry Morgan, alias Moreland
Charles Prince as Henchman Al
Edward Earle as Arthur Stevens
Fern Emmett as Miss Wallace
Byron Foulger as Ole—Houseboy
George Cleveland as George Davis
Burr Caruth as Peter Lanning
Jack Ingram as Chuck—Thug
Frank McCarroll as Henchman Shorty

Soundtrack

External links

1937 films
American detective films
American mystery films
American black-and-white films
Films directed by Leslie Goodwins
Films based on short fiction
1937 mystery films
1930s English-language films
1930s American films